The Diocese of Edinburgh is one of the seven dioceses of the Scottish Episcopal Church. It covers the City of Edinburgh, the Lothians, the Borders and Falkirk. The diocesan centre is St Mary's Cathedral, Edinburgh. The Bishop of Edinburgh is the Right Revd Dr John Armes.

History

A number of important events took place in the city which put the Edinburgh diocese at the centre of the formation of the Scottish Episcopal Church. Unlike the other dioceses of the Episcopal Church which were inherited from the organisation of the Catholic Church, the Diocese of Edinburgh is a relatively recent creation, having been founded in 1633 by King Charles I, the year of his Scottish coronation. William Forbes was consecrated on 23 January 1634 in St. Giles' Cathedral as the first bishop of Edinburgh.

Forbes died only three months after his consecration and David Lindsay succeeded him as bishop of the nascent episcopal see. At this time, the effects of the Scottish Reformation were taking a new turn and Lindsay, along with all other bishops in Scotland, was deposed in 1638 and the heritage and jurisdiction of the church passed into the hands of the Presbyterian Church of Scotland. A period of great political and ecclesiastical turmoil ensued with the Bishops' Wars and the Wars of the Three Kingdoms engulfing Scotland and England. It was not until the Restoration of the monarchy that the Episcopacy was restored to the Scottish Church and George Wishart was consecrated as the new Bishop of Edinburgh in 1662.

Episcopal rule was short-lived. In 1689 Alexander Rose (bishop 1687-1720) found himself caught up in the Jacobite conflict following the Glorious Revolution. Scottish bishops were under pressure to declare their allegiance to William of Orange over the Stuart King James VII

During an audience with the new King William in 1690, Rose's ambiguous declaration arose royal displeasure:

With Jacobite sympathies running throughout the Episcopal wing of the church, the Scottish Episcopalians were disestablished and Presbyterian polity was permanently established in the Church of Scotland. Rose departed from St Giles' Cathedral in 1689 and took with him a number of supporters from the congregation to begin a separate church. They took over a former wool store a short distance down the Royal Mile as a venue for their worship; today, Old St Paul's Church is located on this site, and claims to be the oldest Episcopal congregation in Scotland.

For many years, Edinburgh (like the other Episcopal dioceses in Scotland) had no cathedral church. Gradually, as Non-Jurors and Qualified congregations were reconciled and the penal laws were repealed (1792), the Episcopal Church moved back into the mainstream of Scottish religious life; secret Episcopalian meeting houses were replaced by churches, a number of which served as pro-cathedrals for Edinburgh. By the late nineteenth century, the Diocese of Edinburgh was in a position to build its own cathedral through donations from wealthy benefactors, and in 1874 the foundations were laid for St Mary's Cathedral on Palmerston Place in the West End. This new cathedral, completed in 1879, was designed in the Gothic Revival style by Sir George Gilbert Scott and its three massive spires reaching  and  can be seen on the western skyline from Princes Street.

The High Kirk of St Giles still stands today on the Royal Mile; while it is commonly referred to as "St Giles' Cathedral" this is an honorary title as, being a Presbyterian church, lacks a cathedra (the throne of a Bishop). Another St Mary's Cathedral also exists in Edinburgh, the Roman Catholic Cathedral which is situated on Picardy Place at the top of Leith Walk.

Area and population 
The diocese covers the historic counties of Linlithgowshire, Midlothian, Haddingtonshire, Berwickshire, Peeblesshire, Selkirkshire, Roxburghshire and the Falkirk area of Stirlingshire.

This total population of approximately 1,082,000 gives the diocese a ratio of one priest to every 21,200 inhabitants and one church to every 20,000 inhabitants.

Notable people

Bishops

Deans

The most senior appointed priest of the Diocese is the Dean of Edinburgh. The dean fulfils a role similar to that of an archdeacon in other provinces of the Anglican Communion. The head of the diocese's cathedral is titled the Provost.

 1919–1929: Harry Reid
 1929–1939: William Perry
 1939–1954: Roderick Mackay
 1954–1961: David Porter
 1962–1967: George Martineau
 1967–1976: Robert Clark
 1976–1982: Ernest Brady
 1982–1985: Malcolm Clark
 1985–1986: Ernest Brady; second time in office
 1986–1991: Brian Hardy
 1991–1992: Douglas Cameron
 1992–2001: Tim Morris
 2001–2004: Jim Mein
 2004–2010: Kevin Pearson
 2010–2012: John Armes
 2012–2017: Susan Macdonald
 2017–present: Frances Burberry

Churches

The Episcopal cathedral is St Mary's Cathedral, at the West End of the city. Notable Episcopal churches in the Edinburgh diocese include Rosslyn Chapel, popularised by Dan Brown's novel The Da Vinci Code; the Priory Church, South Queensferry, the only medieval Carmelite church still in use in the British Isles; and Old St Paul's, the oldest Episcopal congregation in Scotland.

The diocese currently has 50 stipendiary clergy and 53 churches.
Last fully updated 19 September 2018.

Former congregation

Closed churches in the diocese

Twinning
The Diocese of Edinburgh is twinned with the dioceses of two other churches:

Anglican Diocese of Dunedin (Anglican Church in Aotearoa, New Zealand and Polynesia)
Diocese of Connor (Church of Ireland)

References

Edinburgh
Christianity in Edinburgh
1634 establishments in Scotland
Religious organizations established in the 1630s
Dioceses established in the 17th century